Werner Mensching (23 December 1933 – 21 June 1997) was a West German pair skater.  With his wife Rita Blumenberg, he won the silver medal at the 1958 German Figure Skating Championships.  The pair finished 7th at the 1960 Winter Olympics and 4th at the European Figure Skating Championships in 1961.

Results
(with Blumenberg)

References
 Sports-Reference.com

1933 births
1997 deaths
German male pair skaters
Figure skaters at the 1960 Winter Olympics
Olympic figure skaters of the United Team of Germany